This article documents the status of motorsports in the 1950s.

United States
Due to the rising popularity of stock car racing, the new Strictly Stock Series is established as the Grand National. The series becomes phenomenally popular, and attracts numerous domestic manufacturers.
The Chevrolet Corvette and Ford Thunderbird become the first true American sports cars. Late in the decade, the Corvette would adopt a V8 engine and become heavily competitive in endurance racing.
The Indianapolis 500 is added to the new grand prix schedule. It is later replaced with a United States Grand Prix in 1959.
Racing legend Phil Hill debuts in 1958.
The SCCA National Sports Car Championship was first contested in 1951, America's first championship for sports cars.
The Twelve Hours of Sebring is first held
NASCAR legend Richard Petty debuts
Debut of racing legend A. J. Foyt in IndyCar
The Hudson Hornet is dominant in NASCAR
The National Hot Rod Association is founded as a professional organization for drag racing
Daytona International Speedway opens
Riverside International Raceway opens. It will last until the 1980s when it will close
Laguna Seca Raceway opens
The original Daytona Beach Road Course closes

Europe
Grand prix racing returns after World War II temporarily halts automobile production. The new grand prix series is known as Formula One.
The debut of racing legend Stirling Moss.
The establishment of the World Sports Car Championship, composed mainly of endurance races such as the 24 Hours of Le Mans.
The beginnings of the British Saloon Car Championship, now the British Touring Car Championship.
The Mille Miglia is last held after thirty years.
The Portuguese Grand Prix debuts in 1958
The Dutch Grand Prix is first held in 1955
The Spanish Grand Prix is first held in 1951
The Porsche 550 Spyder and Porsche 356 are introduced, competitive in motorsport
The Maserati Birdcage is introduced as a competitive racing prototype
The Jaguar D-Type is introduced as a competitive racecar
The Lotus Eleven is introduced for motorsport
The original Mini debuts. It is competitive in touring car racing.
The original Volkswagen Beetle debuts, becoming competitive in touring car racing
The Triumph TR is introduced
The MG A is introduced
Dino is introduced as a brand of Ferrari
Juan Manuel Fangio wins a then-record five Formula One drivers championships, driving for Alfa Romeo

Australia
The rise of famous racer and race car builder Jack Brabham.

South America
The Carrera Panamericana is held from 1950-1954
The Argentine Grand Prix debuts in 1953 as the first F1 race in South America

Africa
The Moroccan Grand Prix, the first F1 race to be held in Africa, is held in 1958

See also
1940s in motorsport
1960s in motorsport

References

 
1950s decade overviews